Carsten Ball and Chris Guccione were the defending champions; however, Ball chose not to compete. Guccione competed with Frank Moser.
Rik de Voest and John Peers won the title, defeating Guccione and Moser 6–7(5–7), 6–1, [10–4] in the final.

Seeds

Draw

Draw

References
 Main Draw
 Qualifying Draw

Comerica Bank Challenger - Doubles
Nordic Naturals Challenger